Frédéric Vitoux may refer to:

Frédéric Vitoux (tennis), French tennis player
Frédéric Vitoux (writer), French novelist